Dendrolaelaps quadripilus is a species of mite in the family Ologamasidae.

This species was formerly a member of the genus Gamasellus.

References

quadripilus
Articles created by Qbugbot
Animals described in 1920